Awarded during the Australian Cricket Awards, the Allan Border Medal is considered to be the most prestigious individual prize in Australian men's cricket. First awarded in 2000, the medal is named after former Australian men's captain Allan Border and recognises the most outstanding male Australian cricketer of the past season as voted by his peers, the media and umpires. Votes are cast after each game on a 3–2–1 basis, with a weighting applied to give both One Day International and Test players an equal chance of winning the award.

Media 

The award ceremony itself is a major publicity event and traditionally takes place at the Crown Casino in Melbourne, towards the end of January or the start of February each year. The 2014, 2015 and 2017 ceremonies however, were all held in Sydney. Due to the COVID-19 pandemic, the 2021 and 2022 ceremonies were unable to be held in person and the awards were instead announced as part of the pre-match show for the BBL Finals.

The award ceremony itself, prior to 2019 was broadcast live and screened on the digital channel Nine (2000 to 2010) and 9Gem (2011 to 2018). Since 2019, the event has been televised live on both Fox Cricket and 7mate channels.

Allan Border Medallists
Five cricketers have won the award more than once. Ricky Ponting and Michael Clarke won the award four times, sharing the award in 2009, as well as Steve Smith (4). The other multiple winners include David Warner who has won the award three times, as well as Shane Watson who has won the award twice. Watson also has the highest vote count of 296, with a huge margin of 100 votes in 2011.

2000: Glenn McGrath
2001: Steve Waugh
2002: Matthew Hayden
2003: Adam Gilchrist
2004: Ricky Ponting
2005: Michael Clarke
2006: Ricky Ponting
2007: Ricky Ponting
2008: Brett Lee
20091: Ricky Ponting and Michael Clarke
2010: Shane Watson
2011: Shane Watson
2012: Michael Clarke
2013: Michael Clarke
2014: Mitchell Johnson
2015: Steve Smith
2016: David Warner
2017: David Warner
2018: Steve Smith
2019: Pat Cummins
2020: David Warner
2021: Steve Smith
2022: Mitchell Starc
2023: Steve Smith
Ref:

1No count-back is used in the Allan Border Medal.

Multiple winners

Belinda Clark Award
The Belinda Clark Award recognises Australia's best women's international cricketer. Like the Allan Border Medal, it is presented annually and determined by matches played in the previous twelve-month period (for example: Ellyse Perry was the winner of the 2020 award, based on her performances predominantly taking place in 2019). The award is named after former national team captain Belinda Clark, whom the similarly titled Belinda Clark Medal—given to the New South Wales Breakers Player of the WNCL Season—also honours.
2002: Karen Rolton
2003: Karen Rolton
2004: Cathryn Fitzpatrick
2005: Karen Rolton
2006: Karen Rolton
2007: Lisa Sthalekar
2008: Lisa Sthalekar
2009: Shelley Nitschke
2010: Shelley Nitschke
2011: Shelley Nitschke
2012: Shelley Nitschke
2013: Jess Cameron
2014: Meg Lanning
2015: Meg Lanning
2016: Ellyse Perry
2017: Meg Lanning
2018: Ellyse Perry
2019: Alyssa Healy
2020: Ellyse Perry
2021: Beth Mooney
2022: Ashleigh Gardner
2023: Beth Mooney

Ref:

Multiple winners

Other awards
During the Australian Cricket Awards, other awards announced include:
  Shane Warne Men's Test Player of the Year,
 Women's Test Player of the Year
 Men's One Day International Player of the Year,
 Women's One Day International Player of the Year,
 Men's Twenty20 International Player of the Year,
 Women's Twenty20 International Player of the Year,
 Bradman Young Cricketer of the Year,
 Betty Wilson Young Cricketer of the Year, 
 Male Domestic Player of the Year,
 Female Domestic Player of the Year,
 Community Champion Award, and
 New members of the Australian Cricket Hall of Fame are also inducted on Allan Border Medal night.

Shane Watson won a total of 7 awards which is the most by any player. He is the only player to have won in all formats and all five major awards for male players. Three players won three major awards including the Allan Border Medal in the same year - Ricky Ponting in 2007, Shane Watson in 2011 and Steve Smith in 2015.

Shane Warne Men's Test Player of the Year
2000: Glenn McGrath
2001: Colin Miller
2002: Matthew Hayden
2003: Ricky Ponting
2004: Ricky Ponting
2005: Damien Martyn
2006: Shane Warne
2007: Ricky Ponting
2008: Brett Lee
2009: Michael Clarke
2010: Simon Katich
2011: Shane Watson
2012: Michael Clarke
2013: Michael Clarke
2014: Michael Clarke
2015: Steve Smith
2016: David Warner
2017: Mitchell Starc
2018: Steve Smith
2019: Nathan Lyon
2020: Marnus Labuschagne
2021: Pat Cummins
2022: Travis Head
2023: Usman Khawaja
Ref:

Multiple winners

Men's One Day International Player of the Year
2000: Shane Warne
2001: Glenn McGrath
2002: Ricky Ponting
2003: Adam Gilchrist
2004: Adam Gilchrist
2005: Andrew Symonds
20061: Michael Hussey
2007: Ricky Ponting
2008: Matthew Hayden
2009: Nathan Bracken
2010: Shane Watson
2011: Shane Watson
2012: Shane Watson
2013: Clint McKay
2014: George Bailey
2015: Steve Smith
2016: Glenn Maxwell
2017: David Warner
2018: David Warner
2019: Marcus Stoinis
2020: Aaron Finch
2021: Steve Smith
2022: Mitch Starc
2023: David Warner
Ref:

1After counting in the 2006 One Day International Player of the Year award, Andrew Symonds, Michael Hussey, Brett Lee and Adam Gilchrist all drew on 22 votes. On a count-back, the winner would have been Andrew Symonds but he was ruled ineligible because he was suspended for 2 One Day Matches for an off-field indiscretion. On a second count-back Michael Hussey was declared the winner.

Multiple winners

Men's Twenty20 International Player of the Year
2011: David Hussey
2012: Shane Watson
2013: Shane Watson
2014: Aaron Finch
2015: Glenn Maxwell
20161: Not awarded
2017: Shane Watson
2018: Aaron Finch
2019: Glenn Maxwell
2020: David Warner
2021: Ashton Agar
2022: Mitch Marsh
2023: Marcus Stoinis
Ref:

1Not awarded due to only 1 T20I played in 2015.

Multiple winners

Bradman Young Cricketer of the Year
The Bradman Young Cricketer of the Year Award has been awarded continuously since 1990 and is The Bradman Foundation's principal award of recognition to elite cricketers.
To be eligible for the award, the player must be a contracted first-class player, be under the age of 24, and have played not more than 10 first-class matches before 26 January.

2000: Brett Lee
2001: Nathan Bracken
2002: Shane Watson
2003: Nathan Hauritz
2004: Shaun Tait
2005: Mark Cosgrove
2006: Dan Cullen
2007: Ben Hilfenhaus
2008: Luke Pomersbach
2009: Phillip Hughes
2010: John Hastings
2011: Trent Copeland
2012: David Warner
2013: Joe Burns
2014: Jordan Silk
2015: Sean Abbott
2016: Alex Ross
2017: Hilton Cartwright
2018: Jhye Richardson
2019: Will Pucovski
2020: Wes Agar
2021: Will Sutherland
2022: Tim Ward
2023: Lance Morris
Ref:

Betty Wilson Young Cricketer of the Year
Named in honour of Betty Wilson, one of Australia's great all-rounders, it recognises a female cricketer who, prior to 5 December, was aged under 25 and had played 10 or fewer matches.
2017: Sophie Molineux
2018: Georgia Redmayne
2019: Georgia Wareham
2020: Tayla Vlaeminck
2021: Hannah Darlington
2022: Darcie Brown
2023: Courtney Sippel
Ref:

Male Domestic Player of the Year
2000: Darren Lehmann (South Australia)
2001: Darren Lehmann (South Australia)
2002: Darren Lehmann (South Australia)
2003: Martin Love (Queensland)
2004: Simon Katich (New South Wales)
2005: Andy Bichel (Queensland)
2006: Phil Jaques (New South Wales)
2007: Chris Rogers (Western Australia)
2008: Ashley Noffke (Queensland)
2009: Michael Klinger (South Australia)
2010: Michael Klinger (South Australia)
2011: Usman Khawaja (New South Wales)
2012: Rob Quiney (Victoria)
2013: Phillip Hughes (New South Wales)
2014: Cameron White (Victoria)
2015: Jason Behrendorff (Western Australia)
2016: Adam Voges (Western Australia)
2017: Cameron White (Victoria)
2018: George Bailey (Tasmania)
2019: Matthew Wade (Tasmania)
2020: Shaun Marsh (Western Australia)
2021: Shaun Marsh (Western Australia)
2022: Travis Head (South Australia)
2023: Michael Neser (Queensland)
Ref:

Multiple winners

Female Domestic Player of the Year
2017: Meg Lanning (Victoria / Melbourne Stars)
2018: Beth Mooney (Queensland / Brisbane Heat)
2019: Heather Graham (Western Australia / Perth Scorchers)
2020: Molly Strano (Victoria / Melbourne Renegades)
2021: Elyse Villani (Victoria / Melbourne Stars)
2022: Elyse Villani (Tasmania / Melbourne Stars)
2023: Annabel Sutherland (Victoria / Melbourne Stars)
Ref:

Australian Cricket Hall of Fame

References

External links

Cricket awards and rankings
Awards established in 2000
Australian sports trophies and awards